The Jack Clarke Medal is an award for the fairest and best player in the West Australian Football League Colts (under-19) competition.

History
The award was previously known as the Burley Medal and the Medallists Medal before being renamed in honour of  footballer Jack Clarke.

Winners

References

West Australian Football League
Australian rules football-related lists